Tonga Sports Association and National Olympic Committee (IOC code: TGA) is the National Olympic Committee representing Tonga.

See also
Tonga at the Olympics
Tonga at the Commonwealth Games

References 

Tonga
Tonga
 
Olympic
Sports organizations established in 1963